Brandon Perea (born May 25, 1995) is an American actor, best known for his performance as Alfonso Sosa on The OA and his breakthrough role of Angel Torres in Jordan Peele's 2022 science fiction horror film Nope.

Early life 
Perea was born and raised in Chicago. He is of Filipino and Puerto Rican descent. He moved out at the age of 16 to pursue his dreams in Los Angeles. Brandon's main talents include acting, jamskating (Breakdancing on Roller-Skates), dancing and BMXing. He's been breakdancing since he was a kid and became Pro at the youngest age in Jamskating history.

Filmography

Film

Television

Music videos

References

External links

1995 births
Living people
Male actors from Chicago
American male television actors
American male actors of Filipino descent
Puerto Rican male film actors
Hispanic and Latino American male actors